David Winton Thomas (26 January 1901 – 18 June 1970) was a British scholar of Hebrew. He was Regius Professor of Hebrew at the University of Cambridge from 1938 to 1968. He was one of the first pupils of Godfrey Rolles Driver. He also played rugby for Wales.

See also
Biblia Hebraica Stuttgartensia

Selected works
Thomas D. Winston, Archaeology and Old Testament Study (1967)

References

1901 births
1970 deaths
Alumni of St John's College, Oxford
British Hebraists
Regius Professors of Hebrew (Cambridge)